Varusham 16 (read as "Varusham Padhinaaru") is a 1989 Indian Tamil-language film, directed by Fazil. The film stars Karthik and Khushbu, with Sukumari, V. K. Ramasamy, Janagaraj, Charle  and Vadivukkarasi in supporting roles. It is a remake of Fazil's own Malayalam film Ennennum Kannettante. The film was released on 18 February 1989, and Karthik won the Filmfare Award for Best Actor – Tamil.

Plot 
The story deals with immature teenage love story between Kannan and Radhika who are cousins (marriage within cross-cousins is common in India). The annual festival is for the village deity is conducted by the patriarch with pomp. 

Kannan is the apple of the large joint family's eye and is spoiled by all. Radhika comes to join the family for the village festival and suddenly, Kannan's position is usurped. He first antagonizes and humiliates her going so far as to hide in her bathroom while she goes to take bath which backfires with him becoming hated in the household and being thrown out of the house forcing him to stay with his friends.

Radhika apologizes for exposing him in his bathroom stunt revealing that she is in love with him since childhood and came here explicitly to see him. Their love blossoms much to the ire of Radhika's paternal grandmother who has other plans for her, to get her married to her US based cross-cousin and settle there. 

Things get ugly and culminates in the festival leading to the death of Radhika, her US based cousin, his grandfather and Kannan going to prison coming out after 16 years taking the mantle of the grandfather as the oldest surviving male.

Cast 
 Karthik as Kannan
 Khushbu as Radhika
 V. K. Ramasamy as Sundaramoorthy
 Poornam Viswanathan as the patriarch
 Janagaraj as Rajamani
 Charle as Narayana
 Tinku as Tabu
 Vijay as Moorthy
 Sukumari as Parvathi
 Vadivukkarasi as Maheshwari
 Jayabharathi as Sundari

Production 
Varusham 16 is a remake of director Fazil's own Malayalam film Ennennum Kannettante. The role of the lead actress was offered to Nirosha; due to her clash of dates, the director choose to cast Khushbu.

Soundtrack 
The music was composed by Ilaiyaraaja, with lyrics by Vaali. The song "Gangai Karai Mannanadi" is set in Todi, a Hindustani raga, "Hey Aiyasamy" is set in Dharmavati, a Carnatic raga, "Karayatha Manamum" is set to Hema Bhushani, "Pazhamuthir Cholai" is set in Harikambhoji, and "Poo Pookum Masam" is set in Keeravani. For the Telugu-dubbed version Premanjali, all lyrics were written by Rajasri.

Release and reception 
Varusham 16 was released on 18 February 1989. N. Krishnaswamy of The Indian Express wrote that Karthik "puts much life and energy into his role", Khushbu "looks just out of school" and Viswanathan was "great as the head of the family", while also appreciating Jayabharathi, Vadivukkarasi and Charle's performances. P. S. S. of Kalki said the film could be watched for the cast performances. Karthik won the Filmfare Award for Best Actor – Tamil.

References

Bibliography

External links 
 

1980s Tamil-language films
1989 films
Films directed by Fazil
Films scored by Ilaiyaraaja
Tamil remakes of Malayalam films